John Horner was the seventh chief of police of the Los Angeles Police Department from May 13, 1885 to December 22, 1885.

See also
List of Los Angeles Police Department Chiefs of Police

References

Chiefs of the Los Angeles Police Department